Amar Hamdy Ahmed Maghrabi Omar (born 30 November 1999) is an Egyptian footballer who plays as a midfielder for the Egyptian national team and the Egyptian Premier League side Al Ittihad Alexandria on loan from Al Ahly.

International
He made his debut for the Egypt national football team on 23 March 2019 in an Africa Cup qualifier against Niger, as a starter.

Honours

Egypt
Africa U-23 Cup of Nations Champions: 2019

References

External links

1999 births
Living people
Egyptian footballers
Egypt international footballers
Al Nasr SC (Egypt) players
Al Ahly SC players
Al Ittihad Alexandria Club players
Egyptian Premier League players
Association football wingers
Footballers at the 2020 Summer Olympics
Olympic footballers of Egypt